84 Ceti is the Flamsteed designation for a binary star system in the equatorial constellation of Cetus. It has an apparent visual magnitude of 5.7, making it faintly visible to the naked eye from dark suburban skies. Parallax measurements with the Hipparcos spacecraft put this system at a distance of around 74 light years.

The primary, 84 Ceti A, is an F-type main sequence star with a stellar classification of F7V. It is slightly larger than the Sun, with 117% of the Sun's mass, 121% of the radius, and 213% of the luminosity. The abundance of elements more massive than helium is 71% of the Sun's and it has a relatively high projected rotational velocity of 32 km/s. This star is estimated to be less than half the age of the Sun, at 2.1 billion years.

The secondary component, 84 Ceti B, has a classification of K2V, making it a K-type main sequence star. It lies at an angular separation of 3.3″ from the primary, which is equivalent to a physical separation of at least 74.5 AU.

The space velocity components of this system are: –13(U), –25(V), –2(W) km/s.

References

Cetus (constellation)
Ceti, 84
F-type main-sequence stars
K-type main-sequence stars
Binary stars
Durchmusterung objects
012530
0790
016765